Edelweiss Group (Officially known as Edelweiss Financial Services Limited) is an investment and financial services company based in Mumbai, India. It is co-founded by Rashesh Shah and  Venkat Ramaswamy.

The company is dealing in various financial services ranging from brokerage services to life insurance and General insurance, private equity and other investment-related services through subsidiaries. It has a network of sub-brokers and authorised people across India. It is registered with National Stock Exchange of India, Bombay Stock Exchange and MCX Stock Exchange. Initially, the company worked on private equity syndication, mergers, acquisitions (M&A) and focused on advisory services. In 2000, the company had capital mark of Rupees 50 million. It acquired Rooshnil Securities in 2017.

History
Edelweiss was founded in 1995 by Rashesh Shah and Venkat Ramaswamy.

Edelweiss worked on mergers & acquisitions, providing advisory and investment banking services. Edelweiss also offered equity broking, portfolio management, and wholesale financing services to individuals and corporates.

1996–2004 
The company became a merchant bank in 2000. It was also helped start-ups raise funds via the non-IPO route, Venture Capital (VC) and Private Equity funds (PE).

2004–2012 
During this period Edelweiss added institutional broking and non-banking financial company (NBFC) activity to its portfolio. In 2007, Edelweiss obtained its Clearing Member License. The same year, Edelweiss commenced asset management business with the launch of real estate funds.

In 2007, Edelweiss Global Wealth Management was established to offer wealth structuring solutions, asset protection, asset transfer strategies, risk management and investment banking solutions.

In 2008, EdelGive Foundation (the company's charitable wing)  was established with education and livelihoods as its primary focus areas.

In 2010, Edelweiss acquired Anagram Capital, for Rs. 164 crore. In 2011, Edelweiss Tokio Life Insurance was established as a joint venture between Edelweiss and Japanese insurer Tokio Marine. Edelweiss held a 74 per cent stake in the JV.

2012–present 
In 2014, Edelweiss Financial Services acquired Mumbai-based asset management company, Forefront Capital Management.

In 2016, Edelweiss Asset Management Company completed the acquisition of fund schemes of JP Morgan Asset Management India.

In September 2016, Edelweiss Financial Services Ltd also agreed to acquire Ambit Investment Advisors' longshot hedge fund Ambit Alpha Fund.

In 2016, Caisse de dépôt et placement du Québec (CDPQ), a pension fund manager in North America, acquired 20 per cent equity stake in Edelweiss Asset Reconstruction Company (EARC) with a view to investing annually in stressed assets and the specialized corporate credit segment, over a four-year period.

In 2022, Edelweiss General Insurance's Group Health Policy includes LGBTQ+ community.

See also
 Edelweiss Broking Limited

References

External links
 

Financial services companies based in Mumbai
Brokerage firms
Indian companies established in 1995
1995 establishments in Maharashtra
Companies listed on the National Stock Exchange of India
Companies listed on the Bombay Stock Exchange